Scooby's All-Star Laff-A-Lympics is a two-hour Saturday morning animated program block produced by Hanna-Barbera Productions and broadcast on ABC from September 10, 1977, until September 2, 1978.

The block featured five Hanna-Barbera series among its segments: The Scooby-Doo Show, Laff-A-Lympics, The Blue Falcon & Dynomutt, Captain Caveman and the Teen Angels and reruns of Scooby-Doo, Where Are You!. During the second season in 1978–79, the show was re-titled Scooby's All-Stars and broadcast on ABC from September 9, 1978, to October 28, 1978. The runtime was reduced from 120 minutes to 90 minutes by dropping The Blue Falcon & Dynomutt and Scooby-Doo, Where Are You!.

Overview 
Scooby's All-Star Laff-A-Lympics included five cartoon segments:
 Captain Caveman and the Teen Angels (one episode, 11 minutes): Comedy/mystery show about three female teenage detectives and their companion, a prehistoric caveman superhero thawed from a block of ice. Sixteen episodes were produced for 1977–78.
 Laff-A-Lympics (one episode, 30 minutes): Based on Battle of the Network Stars, this series featured 45 Hanna-Barbera characters, including Scooby-Doo, Yogi Bear, Mumbly, and others competing in Olympics-styled events. Sixteen episodes were produced for 1977–78.
 The Scooby-Doo Show (one episode, 30 minutes): Comedy/mystery show about four teenage detectives and their talking dog, Scooby-Doo. Eight first-run episodes were produced for 1977–78, with 16 made for The Scooby-Doo/Dynomutt Hour from 1976–77 re-run following the final first-run episode. Two of the new episodes, as well as two others from 1976–77, feature Scooby-Doo's cousin Scooby-Dum as a recurring character.
 Scooby-Doo, Where Are You! (one episode, 30 minutes): reruns of the first Scooby-Doo series, originally run on CBS from 1969–70.
 The Blue Falcon & Dynomutt (one episode, 11 minutes each): New episodes featuring the superhero Blue Falcon and his bumbling cyborg dog sidekick Dynomutt, introduced the previous year in the Dynomutt, Dog Wonder segments of The Scooby-Doo/Dynomutt Hour. The new Dynomutt episodes were two-part cliffhangers, of which eight episodes (four stories total) were produced for 1977–78.

When the show became Scooby's All-Stars during the second season on September 9, 1978, the Blue Falcon & Dynomutt and Scooby-Doo, Where Are You! segments were dropped and two Captain Caveman segments were broadcast instead of just one; eight new Laff-A-Lympics and eight new Captain Caveman segments were produced for the block in 1978–79. The Scooby-Doo Show began the 1978–79 season in reruns, though starting from November 11, seven new episodes (produced for an aborted revival of Scooby-Doo, Where Are You! as a separate half-hour) were run as part of Scooby's All-Stars.

For the 1979–80 season, the block was cancelled and Scooby-Doo became a half-hour show as Scooby-Doo and Scrappy-Doo. Laff-A-Lympics and Captain Caveman would resurface on ABC during the latter part of the season in 1980.

See also 
 List of Scooby-Doo media

References

External links 
 
 Scooby's All-Star Laff-A-Lympics at The Big Cartoon DataBase
 Scooby's All-Stars at The Big Cartoon DataBase

Television series by Hanna-Barbera
American Broadcasting Company original programming
Scooby-Doo package shows and programming blocks
1970s American animated television series
1977 American television series debuts
1978 American television series endings
Television programming blocks in the United States
English-language television shows
American children's animated comedy television series
Captain Caveman and the Teen Angels
Television series created by Joe Ruby
Television series created by Ken Spears
Television series about cavemen